Dalkey Archive may refer to:

 The Dalkey Archive, 1964 novel by Irish writer Flann O'Brien
 Dalkey Archive Press, American publisher of fiction, poetry, and literary criticism